B.F.'s Daughter is a 1948 drama film directed by Robert Z. Leonard and starring Barbara Stanwyck and Van Heflin. It was adapted from John P. Marquand's 1946 novel of the same name, about a prominent couple whose marital tensions come to a boiling point during World War II. The book was controversial for its treatment of social conflicts and adultery, but the film is a sanitized and fairly conventional love story.

The film was released in the UK as Polly Fulton, because "B.F." was a euphemism there for "bloody fool" in the 1940s.

Plot
Polly Fulton is the only daughter of rich industrialist B.F. Fulton. She is involved in a long engagement to family friend Bob Tasmin, an affable, scrupulously honest lawyer who is such a steady guy that he sometimes seems boring. Then she meets brash intellectual Tom Brett, who blames many of the world's problems on the rich. Tom and Polly heartily dislike each other at first, but she finds him exciting compared to the well-meaning "stuffed shirt" Bob. Soon Tom and Polly fall passionately in love and get married.

Tom has a tense relationship with Polly's family from the start. When he gradually realizes that his in-laws are using their connections to advance his career, he is not grateful but bitter. Polly is painfully torn between her strong-willed husband and her devoted father, whom everyone calls "B.F."

When World War II arrives, Tom takes a high-level civilian position in Washington, doing work that he cannot discuss. He and Polly rarely see each other and begin to lead separate lives. Two wartime developments eventually bring the relationship to a crisis point. First, Polly hears a rumor that Tom is having an affair. Then she is stunned by a news report that Bob Tasmin, now a dashing military officer happily married to Polly's best friend, has apparently been killed on a mission behind enemy lines. As the truth about both situations is revealed, Polly and Tom confront their own problems and learn what they mean to each other.

Cast
 Barbara Stanwyck as Pauline "Polly" Fulton Brett
 Van Heflin as Tom Brett
 Charles Coburn as Burton F. "B.F." Fulton
 Richard Hart as Robert S. "Bob" Tasmin III
 Keenan Wynn as Martin Delwyn "Marty" Ainsley
 Margaret Lindsay as "Apples" Sandler
 Marshall Thompson as The sailor
 Spring Byington as Gladys Fulton
 Barbara Laage as Euginia Taris
 Thomas E. Breen as Maj. Isaac Riley
 Fred Nurney as Jan (the butler)
 Pierre Watkin as Joe Stewart, Brett's Boss (uncredited)

Reception
The film earned $1,449,000 in the US and Canada and $461,000 elsewhere, recording a loss of $565,000.

Radio adaptation
On December 11, 1950, Lux Radio Theater broadcast a radio adaptation of B.F.'s Daughter with Barbara Stanwyck reprising her role in the film.

References

External links
 
 
 

1948 films
1948 drama films
American black-and-white films
Films based on American novels
Films directed by Robert Z. Leonard
Films scored by Bronisław Kaper
Metro-Goldwyn-Mayer films
American drama films
1940s American films